Weight is the fourth full-length studio album by the Rollins Band, released on April 12, 1994. It featured the band's biggest hits, "Liar" and "Disconnect". The band recorded the album during a snowy December 1993 in Echo Creek Ranch, in Lake Tahoe, Nevada.

Appearances in other media
The video for the single "Liar" gained further popularity after appearing on a 1994 Beavis and Butt-Head episode titled "Liar! Liar!". Another video from the album, "Disconnect", appeared twice on the series, first in the 1995 episode  "Top o' the Mountain", then as part of the episode "Shortcuts" in March 1997 (coincidentally the same month the band's follow-up Come In and Burn was released). The song "Civilized" was also used as the closing theme for Dennis Miller Live from 1994–2002 on HBO.

Reception and legacy
The album received positive reviews from critics, and had sold 423,000 units in the United States as of 1996, making it their most commercially successful release. Stephen Thomas Erlewine of AllMusic gave it a four-star rating, and labelled it "their most impressive album to date". In 2016, Metal Hammer included it on their "10 essential alt-metal albums" list.

Track listing
All songs are credited to the Rollins Band.
 "Disconnect" – 4:57
 "Fool" – 4:26
 "Icon" – 3:41
 "Civilized" – 3:54
 "Divine" – 4:01
 "Liar" – 6:34
 "Step Back" – 3:58
 "Wrong Man" – 4:19
 "Volume 4" – 4:39
 "Tired" – 3:46
 "Alien Blueprint" – 3:45
 "Shine" – 5:26

Accolades

Personnel

Rollins Band
Sim Cain – drums
Melvin Gibbs – bass
Chris Haskett – guitar
Henry Rollins – vocals

Additional musicians and production
David Bianco – mixing
John Jackson – mixing
Peter Rave – recording
Theo Van Rock – production
Brant Scott – recording
Rob Sieffert – recording
Howie Weinberg – mastering

Chart performance

Album

Singles

References

Rollins Band albums
1994 albums